Tanzania Community Shield ("Ngao ya Jamii") is Tanzanian football's annual match contested between the champions of the previous Tanzanian Premier League season and the holders of the Tanzania FA Cup. If the Premier League champions also won the FA Cup, then the league runners-up provide the opposition. The fixture is recognised as a competitive super cup by the Tanzania Football Federation and CAF.

Winners 

Source: RSSSF

References 

National association football supercups
Football competitions in Tanzania